The 2015–16 Algerian Cup is the 52nd edition of the Algerian Cup. The winners were MC Alger who qualified to the 2017 CAF Confederation Cup. MO Béjaïa were the defending champions, having beaten RC Arbaâ 1–0 in the previous season's final.

Round of 64

Round of 32

Round of 16

Quarter-finals

Semi-finals

Final

References

Algerian Cup
Algerian Cup
Algerian Cup